Rukh is a 2017 Indian Hindi-language thriller-drama film directed by debutant director Atanu Mukherjee. The film stars Manoj Bajpayee, Smita Tambe, Kumud Mishra and Adarsh Gourav in lead roles. The film was released on 27 October 2017.

Plot 
In a school yard fight, 18-year-old Dhruv Mathur (Adarsh Gourav) impetuously hits a fellow student, breaking his leg. He then gets scared and runs away. When the school expels him, his parents send him to a boarding school. Away from home in the boarding school, Dhruv is ignorant about the ongoing crisis in his family. His life takes an unexpected turn as he gets the news of his father Diwakar Mathur's (Manoj Bajpayee) death in a car accident. As he copes with the tragedy, he seeks to find out what happened. Hidden truths begin to unravel. Even as his mother Nandini (Smita Tambe) struggles to shield him, Dhruv starts looking for answers. The search leads to a series of unexpected revelations, as he discovers the shades of his father's personality and his business situation he had never known before. He discovers that his father's business partner, Robin (Kumud Mishra), was involved in shady business dealings and that his father was a good man. Dhruv believes that Robin, his father's crooked business partner, must have had his father murdered. The reality turns out to be something else and Dhruv's mother was trying to withhold information in order to protect Dhruv. Turns out Dhruv's father had borrowed money to pay the workers at his unexpectedly closed factory. The film has an unexpected ending when he is shocked to discover that his father had essentially committed suicide in order to keep his word to pay back the loan he took from a bank owner, and to leave some money for Dhruv and his mother. Dhruv grows up in this process and decides to seek and apologize to the boy he had struck in school a few years earlier.

Cast 
 Manoj Bajpayee as Divakar
 Adarsh Gourav as Dhruv
 Smita Tambe as Nandini
 Kumud Mishra as Robin
 Ila Bhate as Nirmala
 Shubhrajyoti Barat as Jayant
 Pawan Singh as Hassan
 Bhushan Vikas as Shinde
 Vedant Muchandi as Amrit
 Kannan Arunachalam as Rangarajan
 Sandesh Kulkarni as Arif
 Siddharth Chanda as Digant
 Anil Khopkar as Ajit
 Ravi Mahashabde as Jayesh
 Yagya Saxena as Chinmay
 Ahsaas Channa as Shruti
 Ravin Makhija as Bhushan
 Swaroop Khopkar as Usha Aunty

Production 
The motion poster of the film was released on 31 August 2017.

Soundtrack 

The music of the film is composed by Amit Trivedi while the lyrics have been penned by Sidhant Mago. The first song of the film titled as "Hai Baaki" sung by Arijit Singh was released 11 October 2017.

Critical reception 

Rukh received mostly positive reviews.

Rohit Vats of Hindustan Times gave the movie 3.5 out of 5 stars and stated, "Rukh has its own narrative technique. To categorise Rukh as an art-house film would be an injustice to Atanu Mukherjee's talent. It's a ‘different’ film, for the want of a better word."

Times of India also rated the movie 3.5/5 and said, "It's a rare, mature thriller that delivers the goods and keeps you engrossed."

Saibal Chatterjee of NDTV also gave the film 3.5 out of 5 stars and stated, "This film, an exemplar of the virtues of staying true to a chosen creative arc, announces the advent of a new writer-director clearly blessed with instinctive control over the medium."

Koimoi gave the film a 3/5 rating and said, "Manoj Bajpayee Holds Your Guts Till The Last Second".

Rajeev Masand also gave the movie 3 out of stars and stated, "Despite the overwhelming heaviness, and frankly a cop-out ending, the film is powered by its performances. Bajpayee and Tambe both have a melancholic stillness, while Gourav conveys angst and grief through restlessness."

Namrata Joshi of The Hindu called it "a meandering and monotonous feature film".

Anupama Chopra gave the movie 2.5 out of 5 stars and stated that the film is intermittently engaging yet never seems essential.

Accolades

References

External links 
 

2017 films
2010s Hindi-language films
Indian drama films
Films scored by Amit Trivedi
2017 drama films
Hindi-language drama films